Ruel Vernal (born Norberto Paranada Venancio; September 8, 1946) is a Filipino-American actor. He was known for portraying villain and lead roles in many famous Philippine films. He was also known as the first endorser of Red Horse Beer.

Biography
Ruel Vernal was born on September 8, 1946, in Manila, Philippines. His biological father is an American service member U.S. Navy stationed at Subic Naval Base who he never met. His step father is Filipino Antonio Venancio (1901-1985) his mother is Filipina Rosalina Paranada Venancio (1918-1981) both from San Marcelino, Zambales, Philippines. He also has children who were veteran actors Mark Vernal and Kevin Vernal.

Filmography

Film

Notable films
1971 - Asedillo
1974 - Ang Pinakamagandang Hayop sa Balat ng Lupa
1976 - Insiang
1978 - Juan Tapak
1979 - Roberta
1980 - Pompa
1980 - Angela Markado
1982 - Brother Ben
1982 - Cain and Abel
1983 - Roman Rapido
1983 - Kapag Buhay Ang Inutang
1985 - Sa Dibdib ng Sierra Madre
1985 - Baun Gang
1985 - Calapan Jailbreak
1986 - Iyo ang Tondo Kanya ang Cavite
1986 - Mabuhay Ka Sa Baril
1986 - Muslim .357
1986 - No Return, No Exchange
1986 - Kamagong
1986 - Halimaw
1986 - Kapitan Pablo: Cavite's Killing Fields
1986 - Captain Barbell
1986 - Gabi Na, Kumander
1987 - Vigilante
1987 - Boy Tornado
1988 - Kumakasa, Kahit Nag-iisa
1988 - Boy Negro
1988 - Ompong Galapong: May Ulo, Walang Tapon
1988 - Sheman: Mistress of the Universe
1988 - Savage Justice
1988 - Alyas Boy Life
1988 - Eagle Squad
1989 - Long Ranger and Tonton
1989 - Moises Platon
1989 - Impaktita
1989 - Hindi Pahuhuli ng Buhay
1989 - Uzi Brothers
1989 - Joe Pring: Manila Police Homicide
1990 - Sgt. Clarin
1990 - Bad Boy
1990 - Apo, Kingpin ng Maynila
1990 - May Isang Tsuper ng Taxi
1991 - Dudurugin Kita ng Bala Ko
1991 - Noel Juico 16, Batang Kriminal
1991 - Pretty Boy Hoodlum
1992 - Grease Gun Gang
1992 - Dito Sa Pitong Gatang
1992 - Pat. Omar Abdullah: Pulis Probinsiya
1993 - Enteng Manok, Tari Ng Quiapo
1993 - Masahol Pa Sa Hayop
1994 - Hindi Pa Tapos Ang Laban
1994 - Chinatown 2: The Vigilantes
1995 - Alfredo Lim, Batas Ng Maynila
1996 - Kristo
1996 - Hagedorn
1996 - Sandata
1998 - Buhawi Jack
1999 - Black Gun Team 
2001 - Oras Na Para Lumaban
2001 - Masikip Na Ang Mundo Mo
2001 - Eksperto: Ako Ang Huhusga
2003 - Dayo

Television endorsements
1982 - Red Horse Beer
1983 - Red Horse Beer
1983 - Red Horse Beer
1983 - Red Horse Beer
1988-1989 - Standard Electric Fan

References

External links

1946 births
Living people
Filipino male film actors